Aurès is a natural region located in the mountainous area of the Aurès range in eastern Algeria. The region includes the Algerian provinces of Batna, Tebessa, Constantine, Khenchela, Oum El Bouaghi, Souk Ahras and Biskra. Some parts located in Western Tunisia

History
The Awras or Aurès region is characterized both by its mountain terrain and by the Berber Chaoui ethnic group that historically has inhabited the area. The rugged terrain of the Aurès has made the region one of the less developed areas in the Maghreb. Traditionally the women of the region wore tattoos.

It was in the Aurès region that the Algerian War of Independence was started by Berber independence fighters such as Mostefa Ben Boulaïd, who operated from the area. A district of Algeria that existed during and after the War of Independence, from 1962 to 1974, was named after this region.

See also
Chakhchoukha

References

External links
Algeria - Ethnic Groups and Languages
 Les Aurès - Algérie 

Cultural regions of Algeria
Geography of Algeria
Natural regions of Africa
Geography of Batna Province
Geography of Tébessa Province
Geography of Khenchela Province
Geography of Oum El Bouaghi Province
Geography of Souk Ahras Province
Geography of Biskra Province

fr:Aurès